Borzyszkowo refers to the following places in Poland:

 Borzyszkowo, Kuyavian-Pomeranian Voivodeship
 Borzyszkowo, West Pomeranian Voivodeship